Kyle Eric Hill (born April 7, 1979) is an American retired professional basketball player. He was picked by the Dallas Mavericks in the 2001 NBA Draft with the 44th overall draft pick. Hill's NBA rights were then traded by the Mavericks shortly after the draft to the Houston Rockets. Hill ended up never playing in an NBA game and is 1 of 8 players from the 2001 NBA Draft that never played a game in the league.

High school and college career
Hill attended and played basketball at Argo Community High School in Summit, Illinois. He played college basketball at Eastern Illinois University.

Pro career
After being selected in the 2001 NBA draft, Hill immediately went to Europe and signed with the French team ASVEL, where he played in the Euroleague with Nikola Vujčić, where he averaged 13.4 points per game and won the French Cup.

Hill next moved to another French club Pau-Orthez, where he recorded 9.5 points per game in 25 minutes per game. He then played briefly with AEK Athens in Greece, and then with Lauretana Biella in Italy during the 2003–04 season. He followed that with an excellent season with the Croatian club KK Zadar.

After Zadar, he moved to the Italian club Snaidero Udine, where he played well and averaged more than 15 points per game during the 2005–06 season. Soon after that he moved to the Spanish team Girona, but an injury that he suffered to his achilles tendon prevented him from playing much. During the 2007–08 season, Hill played five games with KK Bosna from Sarajevo and he then returned to Udine. He finished the season playing with Snaidero Udine, where he formed one half of the same dynamic duo along with Jerome Allen for the team, and was once again coached by Cesare Pancotto, just like in the 2005–06 season.

On March 1, 2010, Hill signed a contract with Hemofarm Vršac from Serbia. Later, on 2012, Hill signs for Aguas de Sousas Ourense of LEB Plata, Spanish third division.

Coaching career
Hill continues to coach in the Atlanta area with the private coaching service, CoachUp.

References

External links
 ACB.com Profile
 Legabasket Profile
 AEK Athens Profile
 Euroleague.net Profile

1979 births
Living people
ABA League players
AEK B.C. players
African-American basketball players
American expatriate basketball people in Bosnia and Herzegovina
American expatriate basketball people in France
American expatriate basketball people in Greece
American expatriate basketball people in Italy
American expatriate basketball people in Serbia
American expatriate basketball people in Spain
American men's basketball players
ASVEL Basket players
Basketball players from Chicago
CB Lucentum Alicante players
Club Ourense Baloncesto players
Dallas Mavericks draft picks
Eastern Illinois Panthers men's basketball players
Élan Béarnais players
KK Bosna Royal players
KK Hemofarm players
KK Zadar players
Liga ACB players
Pallacanestro Biella players
Pallalcesto Amatori Udine players
Point guards
Shooting guards
21st-century African-American sportspeople
20th-century African-American sportspeople